Ningthou Kangba (1405 BC-1359 BC) was a ruler of Ancient Kangleipak (early Manipur). He is traditionally seen as having invented Sagol Kangjei, the earliest form of the modern day polo sports.
He was the son of King Tangja Leela Pakhangba (1445 BC-1405 BC) and Queen Sinbee Leima. He was the consort of Queen Leima Taritnu, daughter of a king named Nongpok Ningthou of the Nongmaiching Hill in the east of Imphal.

Origin 
According to the Ningthou Kangbalon, an ancient historical account of his family, King Kangba was born in a cave in the Mount Koubru in northern Manipur. Some historians thought that he belonged to the house of the Salang Leishangthem dynasty. However, some thought that he belonged to the house of the Khaba Nganba dynasty.

Heritage site 
In 2018, the Government of Manipur proclaimed that a heritage site will be developed in memory of the king in the Kangmong village, to promote tourism.

Ningthou Kangbalon 
The Ningthou Kangbalon is an Ancient Meitei language historic text (Puya), which presents a brief genealogy of the rulers of Ancient Manipur (Antique Kangleipak) in the pre Christian era. According to the manuscript, King Ningthou Kangba had nine sons, Koikoi, Teima, Yangma, Tesrot, Urenkhuba, Urenhanba, Irem, Khabi and Langba. Teima became a Meitei. 

Yangma went to the West of Kangleipak (present day Manipur) and spread over to Mayang (Cachar and beyond). Tesrot went to Takhel (present day Tripura) and became Takhel (Tripuri). Urenkhuba spread over as a people of Ancient Moirang, Irem went to the North and became Pasa. Khabi/Khaba went to the east and became a part of Chinese people. Langba went to the South and spread over his descendants. The name of Manipur was "Tilli Koktong Leikoilel" during the period of Ningthou Kangba.

References

Bibliography 
 Ningthou Kangbalon

Further reading 
 Manipur, Past and Present: The Heritage and Ordeals of a Civilization
 A Brief history of the Meiteis of Manipur
 SAGOL-KANGJEI
 
 Ningthou Kangba remembered : 07th apr18 ~ E-Pao! Headlines
 
 

Kings of Ancient Manipur
Meitei people
Pages with unreviewed translations